Manla Water Control Project,  also called as Manla Water Conservancy Project, is the first large-sized, modern water control project in Tibet.  Its construction officially  began  in  August  1995 and was completed in August 2001. 

The project has a total installed capacity of 20,000 kilowatts, and its main function is to irrigate more than 400,000 mu of farmland on both sides of the river, as well as flood control and power generation.

The project was invested and constructed by the State Planning Commission and the Ministry of Water Resources, and was undertaken by the Third Corps of Armed Police Hydropower Troops (武警水电第三总队). The total investment is ¥960 million.

References 

Dams completed in 2001
Energy infrastructure completed in 2001
Hydroelectric power stations in Tibet